{{DISPLAYTITLE:Pi1 Columbae}}

Pi1 Columbae, Latinized from π1 Columbae, is a star in the southern constellation of Columba. With an apparent visual magnitude of 6.13, it is a dim, white-hued star that is near the limit of visibility for the naked eye. It is located approximately 280 light years from the Sun based on parallax, and has an absolute magnitude of +1.55.

This is an Am star with a stellar classification of A2mA5-A9. It has 2.5 times the Sun's radius and shines with 20 times the luminosity of the Sun at an effective temperature of 7,765 K. The star is spinning with a projected rotational velocity of 70 km/s.

References

Am stars
Columba (constellation)
Columbae, Pi1
Durchmusterung objects
042078
028957
02171